Omar L. Rosenkrans was a member of the Wisconsin State Assembly.

Biography
Rosenkrans was born in Steuben County, New York in 1843. During the American Civil War, he served with the Union Army. He died in 1926.

Assembly career
Rosenkrans was a member of the Assembly during the 1891 and 1893 sessions. He was a Republican.

References

People from Steuben County, New York
Republican Party members of the Wisconsin State Assembly
People of Wisconsin in the American Civil War
People of New York (state) in the American Civil War
Union Army soldiers
1843 births
1926 deaths